The 2002 World Junior Championships in Athletics were held in Kingston, Jamaica from July 16 to July 21, 2002.

Men's results

Women's results

Medal table

Participation
According to an unofficial count through an unofficial result list, 1069 athletes from 159 countries participated in the event.  This is in agreement with the official numbers as published.

References

External links
Official site (archived)
Organizing committee official site (archived)
IAAF competition site

 
2002
World Junior Championships in Athletics
A
World Junior Championships in Athletics